Hemimycena tortuosa, commonly known as the dewdrop bonnet, is a species of basidiomycete fungus of the family Mycenaceae, of the order Agaricales.

Synonyms 
 Helotium tortuosum (P.D. Orton) Redhead
 Mycena tortuosa P.D. Orton 1960

References

External links 

 http://www.speciesfungorum.org/Names/GSDSpecies.asp?RecordID=112951

Mycenaceae